RNLB H F Bailey (ON 777) is the most famous Royal National Lifeboat Institution (RNLI) lifeboat to have served from Cromer, because she was used by Coxswain Henry Blogg to perform many of his most famous lifesaving exploits. The lifeboat was on station for the ten years between 1935 and 1945. She is now part of the National Historic Fleet and has been preserved in the RNLI Henry Blogg Museum in Cromer.

From 1923 to the end of the Second World War in 1945 the Cromer station had four motor-powered lifeboats all called H F Bailey after the donor, Mr Henry Francis Bailey, a London merchant who had been born in Brockenhurst, Norfolk and had died in 1916.

Construction
H F Bailey was built at the yard of Groves and Guttridge Ltd on the Isle of Wight. Her hull is constructed using double diagonal planking of Honduras mahogany on a framework of teak ribs and beams, with the stem and stern posts and her keel of English oak. The stern and stem posts are grown to the required shape to give the lifeboat its strength and sturdiness. The hull is divided into seven watertight compartments, of which the engine room is one. The hull is fitted with 142 mahogany air cases, each individually made to fit into its allocated position in the hull. Her equipment included the latest innovations of the time which included a line throwing gun and an electric searchlight.

Further use
RNLB HF Bailey went on to serve Helvick Head Lifeboat Station in County Waterford Republic of Ireland until 1969 when the station was closed. It remained closed until 1994 when it was reopened by the RNLI. The lifeboat stationed there today is an Atlantic 75 and provides cover in the area between Youghal and Tramore Lifeboat Stations.

Rescues and service

Gallery

See also
 Cromer Lifeboat H F Bailey ON 694

References

 Cromer Lifeboats 1804–2004, Leach, Nicholas & Russell, Paul, Pub: Tempus Publishing, 2004, .

Further reading
 The History of Cromer Lifeboats and Crew; H.F. Bailey 777 1935 - 1945 Cromer, Kitty Lee, 1991, 

 

Cromer lifeboats
Ships preserved in museums
Ships and vessels of the National Historic Fleet
Watson-class lifeboats